Robert or Rob Holland may refer to:

Robert de Holland, 1st Baron Holand (c. 1283–1328), English nobleman
Dutch Holland (1903–1967), Major League Baseball outfielder
Robert C. Holland (1925–2013), American economist
Robert Holland (executive) (1940–2021), American businessman, CEO of Ben & Jerry's
Bob Holland (1946–2017), Australian cricketer
Robert Holland (ice hockey) (born 1957), Canadian ice hockey goaltender
Rob Holland (pilot) (born 1974), American aerobatics pilot
Robert Holland (Ph.D. 2010), British ecologist, senior fellow at University of Southampton

See also
R. Holland Duell, American lawyer and politician
John Robert Holland, American lawyer